The red-backed whiptail (Aspidoscelis xanthonotus) is a species of teiid lizard found in Arizona in the United States and Sonora in Mexico.

References

Aspidoscelis
Reptiles of Mexico
Reptiles of the United States
Reptiles described in 1953
Taxa named by William Edward Duellman
Taxa named by Charles Herbert Lowe